Crowville is an unincorporated community in Paulding County, in the U.S. state of Georgia.

History
A variant name was "Crowsville". A post office called Crowsville was established in 1891, and remained in operation until 1908. The community was named after Willis M. Crowe, a local merchant.

References

Unincorporated communities in Paulding County, Georgia